Cornesia is a genus of moths belonging to the family Tortricidae.

Species
Cornesia arabuco Razowski, 2012
Cornesia molytes Razowski, 1993
Cornesia ormoperla Razowski, 1981

See also
List of Tortricidae genera

References

 , 2005: World Catalogue of Insects vol. 5 Tortricidae.
 , 1981: Nigerian Tortricini (Lepidoptera, Tortricidae). RAZOWSKI, Acta Zoologica Cracoviensia 25 (14): 319–340.
 , 1993: Revision of Apotoforma BUSCK, 1932 (Lepidoptera: Tortricidae), with descriptions of four other Tortricini species. Acta Zoologica Cracoviensia 36 (1): 183–197.
 , 2012: Tortricidae (Lepidoptera) from the Tervuren Museum: 1. Tortricini and Chlidanotini. Polish Journal of Entomology 81 (2): 129–143. Abstract and full article:

External links
tortricidae.com

Tortricini
Tortricidae genera